Ulochlaena hirta is a moth of the family Noctuidae first described by Jacob Hübner in 1813. It is found in south-eastern Europe and the Mediterranean region, east through Turkey, Iran and the Kopet Dag mountains to the southern Ural.

Adults are sexually dimorphic. Males have a wingspan of 21–35 mm. Females have reduced wings. Adults are on wing from mid-October to the end of December in one generation per year.

The larvae feed on the roots of various grasses. Pupation takes place underground. The species overwinters as an egg.

References

External links

 Taxonomy

"Ulochlaena hirta (Hübner, [1813])". Moths and Butterflies of Europe and North Africa. Retrieved February 7, 2020.
"09636 Ulochlaena hirta (Hübner, [1809-1813])". Lepiforum e.V. Retrieved February 7, 2020.

Moths described in 1813
Cuculliinae
Moths of Europe
Moths of Asia
Moths of the Middle East
Taxa named by Jacob Hübner